is a railway station in the city of  Nikaho, Akita, Japan, operated by JR East.

Lines
Kosagawa Station is served by the Uetsu Main Line, and is located 194.8 km from the terminus of the line at Niitsu Station.

Station layout
The station consists of two opposed side platforms  connected to the station building by a footbridge. The station is unattended.

Platforms

History
Kosakawa Station opened on November 15, 1921, as a station on the Japanese Government Railways (JGR) Rikuusai Line. It was switched to the control of the JGR Uetsu Main Line on April 20, 1924. The JGR became the JNR (Japan National Railway) after World War II. With the privatization of the JNR on April 1, 1987, the station came under the control of the East Japan Railway Company.

Passenger statistics
In fiscal 2014, the station was used by an average of 29 passengers daily (boarding passengers only).

Surrounding area

References

External links

 JR East Station information 

Railway stations in Japan opened in 1921
Railway stations in Akita Prefecture
Uetsu Main Line
Nikaho, Akita